Matijevići is a village in central Croatia, in the municipality of Dvor, Sisak-Moslavina County. It is connected by the D6 highway.

Demographics
According to the 2011 census, the village of Matijevići has 645 inhabitants. This represents 76.42% of its pre-war population according to the 1991 census.

The 1991 census recorded that 94.79% of the village population were ethnic Serbs (800/844), 2.01% were Yugoslavs (17/844), 0.71% were ethnic Croats (6/844), while 2.49% were of other ethnic origin (21/844).

References

Populated places in Sisak-Moslavina County
Serb communities in Croatia